Franco Varisco (10 April 1887 – 23 April 1970) was an Italian footballer who played as a defender. He represented the Italy national football team twice, the first being Italy's first ever match on 15 May 1910, the occasion of a friendly match against France in a 6–2 home win.

References

1887 births
1970 deaths
Italian footballers
Italy international footballers
Association football defenders